The Capel Family is one of the few group portraits by Cornelius Johnson, who is better known for head and shoulders portraits.

The Portrait

It shows Arthur Capel, his wife, Elizabeth Morrison and their children, Mary, Henry, Charles, Elizabeth and Arthur. In the background is the garden at Little Haddon. 

It is on display at the National Portrait Gallery in London. The portrait was probably commissioned to mark Capel's appointment as Baron Capel in 1641.

Provenance
It was bought from Leggatt Brothers in 1970 for £28,350, £3,000 of which was contributed by ArtFund. The provenance was given as Cassiobury, the family home of the earls of Essex. C. H. Collins Baker notes that it was at Cassiobury in 1912.

The Literature
The arrangement of the figures is greatly influenced by Van Dyck's portrait of the family of King Charles I and by Honthorst's portrait of the Buckingham family.

It has been used to illustrate differences in gender status in England in the 16th and 17th century.

Notes

1641 paintings
Baroque paintings
Capell family